Shahid Saidi may refer to:
 Shahid Saidi, Kerman
 Shahid Saidi, Khuzestan